Blue box is an early phreaking tool that simulates a telephone operator's dialing console.

Blue box may also refer to:

Technology
 Link Trainer or Blue Box, a flight simulator
 Blue Box, a Mac OS 8 emulation layer from the Rhapsody OS which became the Mac OS X Classic Environment
 MXR Blue Box, an octave effect for electric guitars
 Nickname of Hessdalen AMS, as it uses a blue container

Entertainment
 TARDIS, or "the blue box", a time machine and spacecraft in the British TV series Doctor Who
 Blue Box (novel), a Doctor Who novel by Kate Orman
 Blue Box (album), a 1996 album by Kate Ceberano
 Blue Box (manga), a manga series by Kōji Miura
 Bluebox Limited, a film production company

Other uses
 Blue Box, common name for the tree species Eucalyptus baueriana and Eucalyptus magnificata
 Blue box (WTO agreement), a subsidy category of the World Trade Organization
 Blue box recycling system, initially a waste management system used by Canadian municipalities
 A nickname for Kraft Dinner packaged stovetop macaroni and cheese
 A British police box
 A severe thunderstorm watch, in meteorology
 JNF collection boxes, Jewish National Fund blue charity collection boxes